Justice Knowlton may refer to:

 Luke Knowlton (1738–1810), associate justice of the Vermont Supreme Court
 Marcus Perrin Knowlton (1839–1918), chief justice of the Massachusetts Supreme Judicial Court
 Wiram Knowlton (1816–1863), associate justice of the Wisconsin Supreme Court